The Eggerss–O'Flyng Building is located at 801 South 15th Street in downtown Omaha, Nebraska, United States. The building was listed on the National Register of Historic Places in 1991, and named an Omaha Landmark on March 17, 1992.

About
The building was constructed in four stages starting in 1902 and finished in 1928. For fifty years it was the headquarters for the Eggerss–O'Flyng Company, which manufactured cardboard boxes. The building was designed in the Renaissance Revival style by John Latenser, Sr. When the building was built it was common for business in Omaha to build warehouses near the railroad on the east and south side of town the Douglas Eggerss–O'Flyng building being one of these.

The Eggerrs–O'Flyng Company was founded by August J. Eggerss, a German immigrant, in 1881. After constructing the building, Eggerss merged with Ivyl O'Flyng in 1903, who became the company's treasurer. William Dennis Lane, who started with the company in 1900 at age 15 as a factory helper, became president in 1932 and remained president until the company was sold sometime after 1950. At its largest, the Eggerrs–O'Flyng Company's payroll was 225 employees. During World War II, the company manufactured cardboard boxes for 20 millimeter shells, 90 millimeter shells, bomb fuses and other items going overseas to the armed forces. For many years, it manufactured cigar boxes, and In its later years, boxes for foodstuffs.

In 1993 the building was renovated at a cost of $3.3 million and turned into loft style apartments. It now houses 48 units. In addition to being listed independently on the National Register of Historic Places individually, the building is listed as a contributing property to the Warehouses in Omaha Multiple Properties Submission.

See also
 Landmarks in Omaha
 History of Omaha

References

Buildings and structures in Omaha, Nebraska
Commercial buildings on the National Register of Historic Places in Nebraska
Headquarters in the United States
John Latenser Sr. buildings
Joseph P. Guth buildings
National Register of Historic Places in Omaha, Nebraska
Omaha Landmarks
Warehouses on the National Register of Historic Places
Commercial buildings completed in 1918